Robert Ainslie was a Scotland international rugby union player. His playing position was Forward.

Rugby Union career

Amateur career

Ainslie played for Edinburgh Institution F.P.

Provincial career

Ainslie played for Edinburgh District in their inter-city match against Glasgow District on 1 December 1887 and on 4 December 1880.

Ainslie was capped by East of Scotland District in their match against West of Scotland District on 9 February 1878 and on 5 February 1881.

Ainslie played for Whites Trial in their match against Blues Trial on 16 February 1878.

International career

Ainslie was capped seven times for Scotland between 1879 and 1882.

Family

Ainslie was the brother of Thomas Ainslie who was also capped for Scotland.

References

Sources

 Bath, Richard (ed.) The Scotland Rugby Miscellany (Vision Sports Publishing Ltd, 2007 )

1858 births
1906 deaths
East of Scotland District players
Edinburgh District (rugby union) players
Edinburgh Institution F.P. players
Rugby union players from Midlothian
Scotland international rugby union players
Scottish rugby union players
Whites Trial players
Rugby union forwards